Nick Hind (born 19 August 1994) is an Australian rules footballer who plays for the Essendon Football Club in the Australian Football League (AFL). He was selected by St. Kilda with pick 54 in the 2018 national draft.  He made his senior debut against Gold Coast in round 13 of the 2019 AFL season.

References

External links

Nick Hind from AFL Tables

St Kilda Football Club players
1994 births
Living people
Australian rules footballers from Victoria (Australia)
Essendon Football Club players